Mạc Mậu Hợp (莫茂洽, 1560–1593) was the fifth and effectively last reigning emperor of the Mạc dynasty from 1562 to 1593.

Biography
Mạc Mậu Hợp was born in 1560 at Đông Đô. He became the emperor in 1562.

In 1592, the Southern dynasty's forces under lord Trịnh Tùng conquered the capital Đông Đô along with the rest of the Northern provinces. Mạc Mậu Hợp was captured during the retreat at one pagoda of Phượng Nhỡn district (Lạng Giang prefecture) and was cut to pieces over three days at Thảo Tân margin (Đông Đô).

However, his son Mạc Toàn and other successors continued to hold Cao Bình county during 1592–3.

Firstly, his temple name was named as Mục Tông (穆宗) then changed as Anh Tổ (英祖) by duke Mạc Kính Cung.

Family
 Father : Mạc Tuyên Tông
 Mother : A concubine of his father
 Wives : Võ Thị Hoành (武氏橫, ?–1592), Nguyễn Thị (阮氏, ?–1600)
 Children : First son has noname, second son Mạc Toàn

References

 
 
 
 
 
Các triều đại Việt Nam – Quỳnh Cư, Đỗ Đức Hùng, Nhà xuất bản Thanh niên, 2001
 Đại Việt Thông Sử, Lê Quý Đôn (1759)

1560 births
1592 deaths
A
People executed by Vietnam
Executed Vietnamese people
Vietnamese monarchs